Akkarampalle is a neighbourhood located in Tirupati city in Tirupati district of the Indian state of Andhra Pradesh. It is located in Tirupati (urban) mandal of Tirupati revenue division. It forms a part of Tirupati urban agglomeration.

Demographics

 India census, Akkarampalle had a population of 20,325. Males constitute 51% of the population and females 49%. Akkarampalle has an average literacy rate of 62%, higher than the national average of 59.5%; with 57% of the males and 43% of females literate. 13% of the population is under 6 years of age. The religious makeup of Akkarampalle is approximately 94.10% Hindus and 5.75% Muslims while Christians, Sikhs, and Jains make up the remaining 1.15%.

Education
The primary and secondary school education is imparted by government, aided and private schools, under the School Education Department of the state. The medium of instruction followed by different schools are English, Telugu.

References 

Tirupati